Kristian Støback Wilhelmsen (born 27 April 1991) is a Norwegian politician for the Conservative Party.

In the 2011 election he was elected to Tromsø city council. In the 2013 election he was elected as a deputy representative to the Parliament of Norway from Troms. For the 2015 local election he headed the Conservative Party ballot in Tromsø, fielding as their mayoral candidate.

References

1991 births
Living people
Conservative Party (Norway) politicians
Politicians from Tromsø
Deputy members of the Storting